Confucian Private Secondary School (CPSS), is a Chinese Independent High School located in Kuala Lumpur, Malaysia. It is one of the oldest Chinese Independent High School in Malaysia. 

The school was founded in 1906 during British rule.

School Symbol

Flag 

 Red: Hot-blooded
 Blue: Ideal 
 Black: Strong
 White: Purity

Seal

History

Pioneering stage (1906-1912) 
 1906 - Loke Yew led the Overseas Chinese and established Confucian School.                             
 1907 - Class officially started on 24 May, with 73 students in total.
 1908 - Kuen Cheng Girls' School established, Zhong Zhuojing was both Confucian and Kuen Cheng's principal.

Turbulent Times (1913-1926) 
 1916 - Song Mulin became the principal and bought a land to build the new educational block.
 1921 - The "School Registration Ordinance" was accepted by the board of directors, caused many dissatisfactions.
 1924 - The Junior Middle department established.

Developing stage (1926-1942) 
 1934 - Huang Guangrao became the principal and the school was improving once again.
 1935 - The Senior Middle department established.                                                               
 1939 - Cantonese-Hokkienese split occurred in the board of directors, the Hokkienese faction established Chong Hwa independent High School in Kuala Lumpur.

Japanese occupation (1942-1945) 
 1942 - The Japanese invaded, school stopped due to the building was occupied by the Japanese.

Recovery period (1946-1948) 
 1946 - The Japanese surrendered, school recoveries was carried out by Lim Lian Geok.                                                                          
 1948 - Impacted by the "Emergency Ordinance" ,left-wing teachers and students was faded out of the school.

Flourishing period (1949-1961) 
 1955 - Became the largest school in central Malaya, with 3800 students in total.
 1958 - Confucian Primary school and Secondary school's administrations were separated.

Alumni
Ong Tee Keat

Connectivity 
 200m from  Plaza Rakyat LRT station.
 200m from  Merdeka MRT station.

External links 
 Official website

Chinese-Malaysian culture in Kuala Lumpur
Secondary schools in Kuala Lumpur
Chinese-language schools in Malaysia
1906 establishments in British Malaya
Educational institutions established in 1906